Maitre Michel Alaux  (1924–1974) was a French-American world renowned fencing master who co-coached the United States Olympic fencing teams in 1964, 1968 and 1972. Internationally recognized for his achievements in the sport and a regular contributor to fencing publications, he has been credited with developing a holistic approach to fencing that helped to bridge the gap between classical schools and the modern Olympic fencing style as it is known today.

Biography

Early life and career
He graduated from the military college, le Fort Carre d'Antibes, in 1947, and immediately established himself in his club, L'Association Jean Louis in Montpellier, France. There, he trained a number of foil and épée champions, the most illustrious being Christian D'Oriola, named Fencer of the 20th Century by the FIE, International Fencing Federation.

At the 1952 Helsinki Olympics, Christian d'Oriola won two Gold medals for Individual and Team foil, winning all ten bouts in the Team events. The French national press Le Monde and Le Figaro congratulated Maitre Alaux.

Michel Alaux was awarded two Medals of Honor by the French Government's Ministry of Sports in recognition of his contribution to fencing: Bronze, in 1949, for the World Championships, followed by Gold, in 1952, for the Helsinki Olympics.

Career in the United States
In 1956, Michel Alaux was invited to the US by the NY Fencers Club. He served three times as US Fencing Olympic coach: 1964 Summer Olympics, Tokyo; 1968 Summer Olympics, Mexico City; 1972 Summer Olympics, Munich; and several times US Nationals, Pan American, and World Championship coach. He remained head fencing master of the NY Fencers Club until his death in 1974, at the age of fifty.

In the course of his US fencing career, Michel Alaux played a key role in developing American fencing official standards and professional requirements. He chaired the 1962–63 U.S. Committee which developed A Text for Defining Fencing Terms. He chaired and directed the committee which devised the official examination for the first professional diploma of Fencing Master in the US (1965).

A passionate exponent of fencing, and seen as a glamorous figure by the media, he served as fencing consultant to TV, newspapers & magazines.

For his contributions to sports education and culture, he was inducted into l'Ordre des Palmes Académiques in 1962.

Career as an author
He was a contributor to US, UK, and French fencing journals. He is the author of Modern Fencing (Charles Scribner's Sons New York. 1975. ).

Legacy
Following his death in 1974, twelve annual US Grand Open competitions (1975–1987) were named after him: The Michel Alaux Grand Open was a three-day international event "considered essentially the same as the Nationals". He was inducted into the US Fencing Hall of Fame in 2006.

Footnotes and references

External links
https://web.archive.org/web/20110220170724/http://www.alaux-fencingmaster.com/index.htm
http://askfred.net/Events/moreInfo.php?tournament_id=13207

1924 births
1974 deaths
French male fencers
American male fencers
French Olympic coaches
American Olympic coaches
French fencing coaches
American fencing coaches
French non-fiction writers
French educators
Recipients of the Ordre des Palmes Académiques
20th-century American male writers
20th-century French male writers
20th-century French educators
20th-century American educators
20th-century American essayists
American male non-fiction writers
French male non-fiction writers
French emigrants to the United States